Danger, Inc. was a company specializing in hardware design, software, and services for mobile computing devices. Its most notable product was the T-Mobile Sidekick (also known as Danger Hiptop), a popular early smartphone. The Sidekick or Hiptop was an early example of client–server ("cloud"-based) smartphones and created the App (Applications) marketplace, later popularized by Android and iOS. Danger was acquired by Microsoft on 11 February 2008, for a price rumored to be around $500 million (USD).

History
The company was originally started by former Apple Inc., WebTV and Philips employees Andy Rubin, Joe Britt, and Matt Hershenson. Co-founder Andy Rubin left in 2003 to create the company Android, which was later acquired by Google.

After the Microsoft acquisition in 2008, the former Danger staff were absorbed into the Mobile Communications Business (MCB) of the Microsoft Entertainment and Devices Division, where they worked on a future mobile phone platform known as "Project Pink" which would eventually be released as Kin. Because of poor sales, production was ceased just a few weeks after its release. The Kin development team was folded into the Windows Phone team, and Microsoft stopped promoting the devices.

By October 2009, most of the ex-Danger employees had left Microsoft. Until March 2013, Rubin headed Android development, and brought former Danger Director of Design Matias Duarte to Google.

The Register described the Microsoft acquisition as "a classic case of M & A failure, where the acquirer has failed to integrate either the technology or the people from the company that it bought." Later in 2013 Microsoft purchased Nokia's mobile phone business, which is also seen as a failure.

October 2009 data loss 

In early October 2009, a server malfunction or technician error at Danger's data centers resulted in the loss of all Sidekick user data.  As Sidekicks store users' data on Danger's servers—versus using local storage—users lost contact directories, calendars, photos, and all other media not locally backed up. Local backup could be accomplished through an app ($9.99 USD) which synchronized contacts, calendar, and tasks, but not notes, between the web and a local Windows PC. In an October 10 letter to subscribers, Microsoft expressed its doubt that any data would be recovered.

The customer's data that was lost was, at the time, being hosted in Microsoft's data centers. Some media reports have suggested that Microsoft hired Hitachi to perform an upgrade to its storage area network (SAN), when something went wrong, resulting in data destruction. Microsoft did not have an active backup of the data and it had to be restored from a month-old copy of the server data, totalling 800GB in size, from offsite backup tapes. The entire restoration of data took over 2 months for customer data and full functionality to be restored.

The Danger/Sidekick episode is one in a series of cloud computing mishaps that have raised questions about the reliability of such offerings.

References

Former Microsoft subsidiaries
1999 establishments in California
2008 mergers and acquisitions
2009 disestablishments in California
American companies established in 1999
American companies disestablished in 2009
Companies based in Palo Alto, California
Computer companies established in 1999
Computer companies disestablished in 2009
Defunct computer companies of the United States
Defunct software companies of the United States
Mobile phone manufacturers